Shadanand is an urban municipality located in Bhojpur District of Province No. 1 of Nepal. It was named after Bala Guru Shadananda.

The municipality was established on 2 December 2014 by merging the then Village Development Committees of Keurepani, Khartimchha, Kimalung, Mulpani and Tunggochha.

VDCs which incorporated into the municipality were: Nepaledanda, Kudak Kaule, Deurali, Sangpang and Boya.

The municipality is divided into total 14 wards and the headquarters of the municipality is situated in Dingla Bazar.

References

External links
Official Website
 Final District 1-75 Corrected Last for RAJPATRA

Populated places in Bhojpur District, Nepal
Municipalities in Koshi Province
Nepal municipalities established in 2014
Municipalities in Bhojpur District